The Music Shop was an Australian television series that aired on Network Ten from 5 August 1996 to 27 November 1998. The series was made by affiliate ADS in Adelaide and was aimed at pre-schoolers.

The concept revolved around three human host, played by Michelle Nightingale, Debora Krizak and Dianne Dixon.  ref></ref> who interacted with the two costumed characters, a Goanna and a Crow, as their participated in various activities at a Music Shop.

References

Australian children's television series
Network 10 original programming
1996 Australian television series debuts
1998 Australian television series endings
Television shows set in Adelaide